Saint Ursus of Aosta (fl. 6th century) was an Italian evangelist, today venerated as a saint.

Biography
Ursus is an Italian saint of the 6th century.  His feast day is February 1 (June 17 in some areas). The collegiate church of Saint Ursus in Aosta is dedicated to him.

Said to have been of Irish origin, he evangelized the region of Digne. When Plocean, an Arian, became bishop of Aosta, Ursus and several other canons left the cathedral of Aosta and established themselves at the present site of the collegiate church of Saint Ursus.

External links
Saints of February 1: Ursus of Aosta
 Sant'Orso d'Aosta
 Foire de Saint-Ours

6th-century Christian saints
Italian Roman Catholic saints
People from Aosta
Medieval Irish saints on the Continent
6th-century Irish priests
Irish expatriates in Italy